The eighth season of NCIS: Los Angeles, premiered on CBS on Sunday, September 25, 2016 with a two-episode premiere and concluded on May 14, 2017. The season contained 24 episodes. For the 2016-17 U.S. television season, the eighth season of NCIS: Los Angeles ranked #11 with an average of 12.51 million viewers and in the 18–49 demographic ranked 43rd with a 1.8/6 Rating/Share.

Cast

Main 
 Chris O'Donnell as Grisha "G." Callen, NCIS Supervisory Special Agent (SSA) of the Office of Special Projects (OSP) in Los Angeles
 Daniela Ruah as Kensi Blye, NCIS Junior Special Agent
 Eric Christian Olsen as Marty Deeks, LAPD Detective and NCIS Liaison
 Barrett Foa as Eric Beale, NCIS Technical Operator
 Renée Felice Smith as Nell Jones, NCIS Special Agent and Intelligence Analyst
 Miguel Ferrer as Owen Granger, NCIS Assistant Director (episodes 1–16)
 Linda Hunt as Henrietta Lange,  NCIS Supervisory Special Agent and Operations Manager
 LL Cool J as Sam Hanna, NCIS Senior Agent, second in command

Recurring 
 Vyto Ruginis as Arkady Kolcheck, Anna's father
 Peter Cambor as Nate Getz, NCIS Special Agent
 Erik Palladino as CIA Officer Vostanik Sabatino
 Aunjanue Ellis as Michelle Hanna, "Quinn", Sam's wife
 Jeronimo Spinx as NCIS Agent Thompson
 Elizabeth Bogush as Joelle Taylor, CIA Agent
 Bar Paly as Anastasia "Anna" Kolcheck, Arkady's daughter
 India de Beaufort as Alexandra Reynolds
 Jackson Hurst as Undersecretary of Defense Corbin Duggan
 Lisa Maley as Sue Chen
 Anslem Richardson as Tahir Khaled
 Kurt Yaeger as Sullivan / CIA Officer Ferris
 Adam Bartley as Carl Brown
 Tom Winter as Nassir, NCIS Special Agent
 Salvator Xuereb as Randall Sharov
 Sammy Sheik as Ahmed Han Asakeem
 John M. Jackson as Rear Admiral A. J. Chegwidden, JAGC, USN (Ret.)
 Pamela Reed as Roberta Deeks, Deeks' mother
 Karina Logue as LAPD Detective Ellen Whiting

Guest appearances 
 Salem Mikhael as Ben Mir (Episode 3)
 Laura Harring as Julia Feldman (episodes 4 & 10)
 Byron Mann as Zhang Kiu (episode 4)
 Daniel Marin as Carlos Gutierrez (episode 4)
 TJ Ramini as John Martin / Tobin Shaked (episode 6)
 James Sayess as Gabriel Mir (episode 3)
 Daniel J. Travanti as Nikita Aleksandr Reznikov / Garrison, Callen's father (episodes 9 & 16)
 Azie Tesfai as King (episode 17)
 Bruce Thomas as LA District Attorney Frank Gibson (episode 17)
 Lester Speight as Max "Champ" Champion (episode 17)
 Scott Grimes as Digital Forensics Specialist Dave Flynn (episode 18; last seen in season 4 episodes "Red" and "Red-2")
 David Fumero as Air Marshal Miguel Salazar (episode 19)
 James Remar as Admiral Sterling Bridges (episodes 21 & 22)
 Carl Lumbly as Charles Langston (episodes 21 & 22)
  Jennifer Jalene as LAPD Detective Lisa Mayne (episode 23)
 Alyssa Diaz as Jasmine Garcia
 David Paul Olsen as Tom Olsen, Sam’s former SEAL buddy (episode 23)

Episodes

Ratings

Home video release

References 

8
2016 American television seasons
2017 American television seasons